Samar Sen may refer to:

 Samar Sen (1916-1987), Bengali-speaking Indian poet, journalist
 Samar Sen (diplomat) (1914-2003), Indian diplomat
 Samar Sen (economist) (c. 1915-2004), Indian agricultural economist